is a Japanese online reality simulation computer game developed by Transcosmos Inc.

Concept
Meet Me shares many similarities with competing reality simulator games, such as Second Life. It also introduces a number of innovations such as the inclusion of realistic, 3-dimensional renderings of real-world locations; common means of transportation such as trains (characters will not have the ability to fly or teletransport themselves) and, above all, strict content regulations aimed at providing an obscenity and gambling-free gaming experience for players of all ages.

Economy
Meet Me uses two separate currencies, Cocore ore and MMP.  Co-Core can be earned in multiple ways, such as playing games.  Cocore requires no payment, and there is technically an infinite amount in existence.  MMP can be earned by making the leaderboard for one of the two Meet Me web games, Reversi and Connect6, in which a uniform amount of 50MMP is awarded, regardless of a player's position on the leaderboard.  It can also be purchased in exchange for actual money.  The only currency that can be used to purchase MMP is Japanese yen.

Localization
Meet Me is set for release in December 2007 and currently being developed for Microsoft Windows (more specifically Windows Vista) even though other options (namely Windows XP) are also being considered.
The game is currently only available for residents of Japan, and is only available in Japanese. The game was originally to be made available not just in Japanese, but also Korean, Chinese and English.

See also
 Second Life

References

External links
 Meet Me

2007 video games
Japan-exclusive video games
Video games developed in Japan
Virtual world communities
Multiplayer online games
Windows games
Windows-only games